Boana icamiaba is a frog in the family Hylidae endemic to Brazil.

Original description

References

Boana
Amphibians of Brazil
Endemic fauna of Brazil
Amphibians described in 2018